Cary Pigman (born November 1, 1958) is a Republican politician from Florida. he was a Republican member of the Florida House of Representatives from 2012 to 2020, representing the 55th District, includes Glades, Highlands, Okeechobee, and western St. Lucie County.

Personal life

Military service
Cary Pigman is a doctor in the U.S. Army Reserve. On May 10, 2013, Pigman reported for active duty as an emergency medicine physician, part of Operation New Dawn in Kuwait. As a doctor in the Reserves, Pigman was deployed three months, followed by 24 months of inactive service.

Professional career
Cary Pigman is an emergency-medicine physician at Florida Hospital Heartland.

Criminal History
Cary Pigman was arrested in March 2017, just hours after a House Session, when a Florida Highway Patrol trooper spotted Pigman's Jeep drifting on Florida's Turnpike. The arresting trooper reported that a BOLO, or "be-on-the-lookout," had been issued for a reckless southbound motorist shortly before the traffic stop. Troopers reported following Pigman's Jeep as it drifted across lanes and once into the right paved shoulder.

According to the report Pigman denied he had been drinking, but the arresting trooper detected an "odor of alcohol" coming from the vehicle. The trooper saw an open wine bottle in the front passenger seat of a vehicle in which Pigman was the only occupant. Nearly three hours after being pulled over, breath tests measured Pigman's blood-alcohol content at 0.14 and 0.15%, which are nearly double the legal limit of 0.08%.

During one field sobriety exercise, Pigman was described as “so off balance he almost fell while attempting to conduct all three tasks," reports show. He stumbled and lost his balance in another test, and didn't follow instructions in another.

Pigman was found guilty of Driving Under the Influence in April 2017 and is currently serving probation. His license was suspended for six months and he was ordered to pay a $500 fine, perform 50 hours of community service and attend DUI school.

Political career

2012 elections
In 2012, following redistricting, Cary Pigman ran against former State Representative Randy Johnson in the Florida House District 55 Republican Primary Election. Pigman defeated Johnson by 26 votes.

In the general election, Cary Pigman faced off against Democratic nominee Crystal Drake. Ultimately, Pigman defeated Drake, winning 56% of the vote.

Subsequent elections and legislative career
Pigman was reelected in 2014 without opposition and in 2018 was re-elected even though he faced opposition from democratic candidate Audrey Asciutto

After Pigman's DUI arrest in March 2017, he resigned as Chairman of the House Health Quality Subcommittee.

Pigman was term-limited from the House in 2020, after serving four terms.

State Commission On Ethics Investigation
In September 2016, the state Commission on Ethics found probable cause that Cary Pigman "misused his position by linking his efforts to obtain legislative funding for the Okeechobee School District to retaliate" against Tracy Downing, principal of South Elementary School in Okeechobee County. The Commission reported that Pigman was having an "extramartial affair" with his district secretary, Elizabeth "Libby" Maxwell, that started on January 15, 2016. Maxwell is married to Devin Maxwell, the brother of Tracy Downing.

References

External links
Florida House of Representatives - Cary Pigman
Pigman for State House

1958 births
Living people
Republican Party members of the Florida House of Representatives
21st-century American politicians
Ohio State University College of Medicine alumni
People from Mount Vernon, Ohio
Xavier University alumni